Emil Urch (18 July 1911 – 24 June 1980), nicknamed Urec, was a Croatian footballer who played as a goalkeeper and made two appearances for the Croatia national team. He also occasionally played as a forward for NK Jaska, in addition to his usual role as goalkeeper. He later worked as a manager for lower-division clubs in Zagreb.

Career
Urch made his international debut for the Independent State of Croatia, a World War II-era puppet state of Nazi Germany, on 5 April 1942 in a friendly match against Italy, which finished as a 0–4 loss in Genoa. He earned his second and final cap six days later on 11 April in a friendly match against Bulgaria, which finished as a 0–6 loss in Zagreb.

Personal life
Urch died on 24 June 1980 at the age of 69.

Career statistics

International

References

External links
 

1911 births
1980 deaths
Sportspeople from Pula
People from Austrian Littoral
Association football goalkeepers
Association football forwards
Yugoslav footballers
Croatian footballers
Croatia international footballers
HŠK Građanski Zagreb players
GNK Dinamo Zagreb players
Yugoslav football managers
Association football player-managers